Illiana is an unincorporated community in Newell Township, Vermilion County, Illinois, United States.  In this area, State Line Road runs along the border between Illinois and Indiana; Illiana is just across the road from the town of State Line City in Warren County in Indiana.  The name is a portmanteau of Illinois and Indiana.

References

Unincorporated communities in Vermilion County, Illinois
Unincorporated communities in Illinois